The 2018 City of Jesolo Trophy was the 11th annual Trofeo di Jesolo gymnastics competition held in Jesolo, Italy. Both senior and junior gymnasts were invited to compete.

Medal table

Medalists

Results

Senior

All-Around

Vault

Uneven Bars

Balance Beam

Floor Exercise

Junior

All-Around

Vault

Uneven Bars

Balance Beam

Floor Exercise

Participants
The following federations sent teams:

References 

2018 in gymnastics
City of Jesolo Trophy
2018 in Italian sport
International gymnastics competitions hosted by Italy